Papyrus 77 (in the Gregory-Aland numbering), designated by 𝔓77, is a papyrus manuscript of the Gospel of Matthew verses 23:30-39. It is written in Greek and has palaeographically been assigned a date anywhere from the middle 2nd century to the early 3rd century.

According to Comfort, Papyrus 77 together with Papyrus 103 probably belong to the same codex.

 Text 
The Greek text of this codex is a representative of the Alexandrian text-type. Aland ascribed it as a “at least normal text”, and placed it in Category I. 
𝔓77 has the closest affinity with Codex Sinaiticus.

 Present location 
It is currently housed at the Sackler Library (P. Oxy. 2683) in Oxford.

Textual Variants 

 23:30: Rearranges the words αυτων κοινωνοι (their partners) to κοινωνοι αυτων ('partners of them').
 23:37: Has variant spelling ορνιξ for ορνις (hen).
 23:37: Originally omitted και from the text. Scribe added it later superlinearly between πτερυγας and ουκ.
 23:38: According to the transcription from the University of Münster Institute for New Testament Textual Research, the scribe omitted ερημος (desolate). According to the transcription of Philip Comfort and David Barrett however, the scribe included it.

See also 
 List of New Testament papyri
 Matthew 23

References

Further reading 

 L. Ingrams, P. Kingston, Peter Parsons, and John Rea, Oxyrhynchus Papyri, XXXIV (London: 1968), pp. 4–6.

Images 
 P.Oxy.LXVI 2683 from Papyrology at Oxford's "POxy: Oxyrhynchus Online"
 Papyrus 77 recto
 Papyrus 77 verso

New Testament papyri
3rd-century biblical manuscripts
Early Greek manuscripts of the New Testament
Gospel of Matthew papyri
Sackler library manuscripts